Green Clay (August 14, 1757 – October 31, 1828) was an American businessman, planter, military officer and politician from Kentucky. Clay served in the American Revolutionary War and was commissioned as a general to lead the Kentucky militia in the War of 1812. He was believed to be one of the wealthiest men of the state, owning tens of thousands of acres of land, many slaves, several distilleries, a tavern, and ferries.

Early life and education
Clay was born in Powhatan County, Virginia in 1757 to Charles and Martha Clay. During the American Revolution, Clay enlisted as  Private in Captain William McCracken's Company, Clark's Illinois Regiment of Virginia Militia, serving under General George Rogers Clark during the Illinois Campaign. He also served for a time with the Continental Army. After the war he joined the westward migration to Kentucky, where he became a surveyor. This gave him a chance to assess lands for cultivation and development. He was a cousin of US Congressman and statesman Henry Clay and Alabama governor Clement Comer Clay.

Kentucky
Clay developed and owned several distilleries and a tavern in central Kentucky, where development occurred near Lexington. He also started a business providing ferry service at several stops across the winding Kentucky River.

In 1789 he was elected Kentucky's representative to the Virginia House of Delegates (when the western territory was still part of that state). Later he was elected and served in both the house and senate of the Kentucky General Assembly.

Marriage and family
In 1795, Green Clay at 38 married the much younger Sally Lewis (d. 1867) in Kentucky. She was the daughter of Thomas and Elizabeth (Payne) Lewis. They had seven children, of whom six survived to adulthood. Their first child was Elizabeth Lewis Clay (1798-1887) and other daughters were Pauline, Sallie, and Sophia (b. 1813; d. 1814). 
Their sons were Sidney, Brutus J. Clay (b.1808), Elijah (b. 1815), and Cassius Marcellus Clay (b.1810).

At age 17, Elizabeth married John Speed Smith, who became a politician in Kentucky and U.S. Congressman. Their son Green Clay Smith was named for his maternal grandfather; like his father, maternal uncles Brutus and Cassius, and cousins, he also became a politician in Kentucky and the U.S. Congress.

War of 1812
During the War of 1812, Clay was commissioned as a general in the Kentucky militia.  In the spring of 1813, he was ordered to the aid of General William Henry Harrison, who was besieged by British forces at Fort Meigs, Ohio. Clay fought his way into the fort; however, many of his men were taken prisoner by Tecumseh after they had captured a British artillery battery.

When the British abandoned the siege, Clay was left in command of the fort. He was still commanding when the British returned in July 1813. In an attempt by Tecumseh to lure Clay and the garrison out of the fort, the native warriors staged a mock battle, appearing to ambush a column of American reinforcements.  Clay was not fooled, since he knew no reinforcements were coming. He was able to hold out until the British again retreated.

Later years
After the war, Clay returned to his plantation, and spent the rest of his life directing the labor of his many slaves in cultivating commodity crops of tobacco and hemp. He is thought to have been the wealthiest man in Kentucky of his time, as his many slaves were valuable as property. He died at his home in 1828 at the age of 73, and was buried with Masonic rites in Richmond, Kentucky.

His widow Sally Lewis Clay married again, to Jeptha Dudley, a Baptist minister. She moved with him to Frankfort, Kentucky, living there for nearly 40 years before her death in 1867.

Legacy and honors
Clay County, Kentucky, was named in his honor.

Notes

External links
"Portrait of Green Clay" and other family members, White Hall-Clermont Foundation
"Green Clay collection (1753-1818)", Papers related to Clay's command of the Kentucky militia in the War of 1812, William L. Clements Library, University of Michigan.

1757 births
1826 deaths
Delegates to the Virginia Ratifying Convention
18th-century American politicians
People from Powhatan County, Virginia
Continental Army officers from Virginia
American militia generals
Members of the Virginia House of Delegates
Members of the Kentucky House of Representatives
Kentucky militia
Kentucky state senators
People from Kentucky in the War of 1812
Green Clay family
American slave owners